The Nu Wray Inn is an historic hotel located at Burnsville, Yancey County, North Carolina. It was built in 1833 at the time Yancey County was formed and a year before Burnsville was established. It was originally built of logs and had eight bedrooms and a dining room and kitchen. It was listed on the National Register of Historic Places in 1982.
 
Thomas Wolfe spent the night there in 1929 when he was a witness at a murder trial in Burnsville. Elvis Presley and William Sidney Porter (O. Henry) were also guests.

It was owned by the same family for a century until the death of Wray family patriarch Rush Wray.

Writing about the Inn in 1941 the journalist Jonathan W. Daniels said:
Everything is on the table in the Nu-Wray Hotel at Burnsville. Nobody waits to give an order. They bring it in, three or four kinds of meat, all the vegetables of the whole mountain countryside. There are dishes of homemade jellies and preserves. The country ham is excellent. The stout tables do not groan but the stuffed guest rising sometimes does. It is country plenty, country cooked and country served, but in proof that the persisting homesickness for country eating is not entirely based on legend.

References

External links
Official website
Pavement Plato Finds Food at Boarding House Superb

Hotel buildings on the National Register of Historic Places in North Carolina
Colonial Revival architecture in North Carolina
Buildings and structures in Yancey County, North Carolina
Hotels in North Carolina
Hotel buildings completed in 1833
National Register of Historic Places in Yancey County, North Carolina
1833 establishments in North Carolina